Acelino "Popó" Freitas (born September 21, 1975) is a Brazilian politician and a former professional boxer who competed between 1995 to 2017. He is a world champion in two weight classes, having held the WBO super featherweight title from 1992 to 2004, the WBA (Unified) super featherweight title from 2002 to 2004, and the WBO lightweight title twice between 2004 to 2007. After retiring from boxing, Freitas went into politics, and was elected as a legislator for the state of Bahia, from 2011 to 2014. His nickname, Popó, was given to him by his mother, after the sound that babies make while drinking milk.

Early life
Freitas had a difficult childhood, often sleeping on a sandy floor at his house. Since early in his life, he dreamed of a better place to live for his family. A skilled football player, he was more inclined, however, towards the sport of boxing since an early age. He was heavily influenced by his father and brothers, especially Luis Claudio Freitas.
Fellow Brazilian Eder Jofre, generally recognized as the greatest world champion to come out of that country, was one of Freitas' childhood heroes.

Amateur career

Freitas competed for his native country and won a lightweight silver medal at the Pan American Games 1995 in Mar del Plata.

Professional career

Early success 
After the Pan American Games he turned into a professional boxer on July 14, 1995, against Adriano Jose Soares. With his win by knockout in the first round that night, Freitas set off a streak of 29 knockout wins in a row, which places as one of the longest knockout wins streak in boxing history. His first 10 wins were against low level competition, but for fight number 11, he took on the much more experienced Edwin Vazquez, knocking him out in the seventh round.

Between 1997 and 1998, Freitas won four more fights and then took on Francisco Tomas Da Cruz, a former world title challenger of Julio César Chávez. Freitas handled Da Cruz with a knockout in two rounds and then added three more knockout wins before getting his first world title shot.

First World Title
On August 7, 1999, Freitas knocked out WBO Junior Lightweight Champion Anatoly Alexandrov in the first round. Soon after, he signed a contract with cable TV giant Showtime, which began to telecast Freitas' fights to the United States. Freitas then made five defenses of his world title and had one non-title bout, all of which ended in knockout wins. He then went to London and took only 45 seconds to stop Daniel Alicea in another non-title affair. Freitas then beat the former world champion: Al Kotey, the brother of David 'Poison' Kotei, by a ten-round decision.

Freitas vs Casamayor
On January 12, 2002, Freitas decided to sign for a unification bout with the WBA world champion, Joel Casamayor, a Cuban refugee who resides in Florida. In a rousing super featherweight unification title bout battle between unbeaten champions, a controversial knockdown and a blatant foul cost Casamayor his unblemished record and his title as Freitas won a close 12 round unanimous decision.

In a classic boxing confrontation between the Brazilian bomber Freitas (129½) and the Cuban boxer Casamayor (129½), the fighters switched roles midway through their encounter in what was reminiscent of Sugar Ray Leonard's first historic face-off with Thomas "Hitman" Hearns back in 1981. The scientist Casamayor became the aggressive slugger, while the puncher Freitas turned into the boxer as once again the unpredictable transpired in a mega-fight.

A glancing right-hand to the neck of the off-balanced Casamayor in the 3rd round was ruled a knockdown by referee Joe Cortez and intentionally hitting on the break in the 6th saw the Cuban penalized another point. It was the difference in the finale tallies and the two point cushion that the tiring Freitas retained across the boards on all three judges scorecards. Ring officials Robert Byrd, Bill Graham and Dave Moretti having identical scores of 114 to 112 for the Brazilian.

After Casamayor
Next, he went to Phoenix, to fight Nigerian Daniel Attah, with only the WBO belt on the line, winning a 12-round decision on August 3, 2002. The fight was watched by an estimated 91 million viewers in Brazil.

Freitas then retained the title in Chicago with a fourth-round knockout of Juan Carlos Ramirez. On August 9, 2003, he and Jorge Barrios engaged in what Showtime commentator Steve Albert called a candidate for fight of the year. Freitas was floored in rounds eight and eleven, but retaliated with a knockdown of his own towards the end of the eleventh, and ended up retaining the title by knockout in round twelve.

Freitas began 2004 by winning a 12-round unanimous decision over Artur Grigorian on January 4, to become the WBO's world Lightweight champion. On February 1 of that year, the WBA announced it had named Freitas their 2003 Fighter of the year.

Freitas vs Corrales
On August 7, 2004, Freitas lost for the first time, losing his WBO Lightweight title to Diego Corrales by TKO in the tenth round after being knocked down by a left hook in Connecticut.

After Corrales
On April 29, 2006, Freitas defeated Zahir Raheem for the vacant WBO lightweight title by split decision. Freitas announced his retirement as a professional boxer on October 4, 2006. Later on, he announced his come back from retirement, and the WBO re-instated him as their lightweight champion.

On April 28, 2007, he fought Juan Diaz in Mashantucket, USA, losing by TKO after his trainer stopped the bout at the beginning the 9th round, drawing boos from the crowd.

He has fought three times since his last loss (2012, 2015, and most recently in November 2017), all wins against inferior competition and all in South America (two wins by knockout and one win by 8-round unanimous decision).

Personal life

Freitas' childhood hero was Brazilian boxer Eder Jofre. His career in boxing was heavily influenced by his older brother Luis Claudio Freitas.

He has been able to help his family financially and has built a soccer field in his mansion, allowing him to practice his second favorite sport.

Freitas' married wife Eliana Guimarães in 2001, they divorced in 2003.

He was Secretary of Sports in Salvador and is member of Brazilian Republican Party.

The careers of Acelino Freitas and Luis Claudio Freitas are depicted in the 2019 biographical TV series Irmãos Freitas, directed by Walter Salles and Sérgio Machado. Brazilian actors Daniel Rocha and Rômulo Braga co-star as Acelino Freitas and Luis Claudio Freitas.

Boxing record

Professional 

{|class="wikitable" style="text-align:center; font-size:95%"
|-
!
!Result
!Record
!Opponent
!Type
!Round, time
!Date
!Location
!Notes
|-
|43
|Win 
|41–2
|style="text-align:left;"| Gabriel Martinez
|UD 
|8 
|Nov 11, 2017
|style="text-align:left;"| 
|
|-
|42
|Win 
|40–2
|style="text-align:left;"| Mateo Damian Veron
|TKO
|3 (10), 
|Aug 15, 2015
|style="text-align:left;"| 
|
|-
|41
|Win 
|39–2
|style="text-align:left;"| Michael Oliveira
|TKO
|9 (10), 
|Jun 2, 2012
|style="text-align:left;"| 
|
|-
|40
|Loss 
|38–2
|style="text-align:left;"| Juan Díaz
|RTD
|8 (12), 
|Apr 28, 2007
|style="text-align:left;"| 
|style="text-align:left;"|
|-
|39
|Win 
|38–1|| align=left| Zahir Raheem
|SD 
|12
|Apr 29, 2006
|style="text-align:left;"| 
|style="text-align:left;"|
|-
|38
|Win 
|37–1
|style="text-align:left;"| Fabian Salazar
|KO
|1 (10), 
|Jul 16, 2005
|style="text-align:left;"| 
|
|-
|37
|Win 
|36–1
|style="text-align:left;"| David Saucedo
|UD 
|10 
|Dec 11, 2004
|style="text-align:left;"| 
|
|-
|36
|Loss 
|35–1
|style="text-align:left;"| Diego Corrales
|TKO
|10 (12), 
|Aug 7, 2004
|style="text-align:left;"| 
|style="text-align:left;"|
|-
|35
|Win 
|35–0
|style="text-align:left;"| Artur Grigorian
|UD 
|12
|Jan 3, 2004
|style="text-align:left;"| 
|style="text-align:left;"|
|-
|34
|Win 
|34–0
|style="text-align:left;"| Jorge Rodrigo Barrios
|TKO
|12 (12), 
|Aug 9, 2003
|style="text-align:left;"| 
|style="text-align:left;"|
|-
|33
|Win 
|33–0
|style="text-align:left;"| Juan Carlos Ramírez
|TKO
|4 (12), 
|Mar 15, 2003
|style="text-align:left;"| 
|style="text-align:left;"|
|-
|32
|Win 
|32–0
|style="text-align:left;"| Daniel Attah
|UD 
|12
|Aug 3, 2002
|style="text-align:left;"| 
|style="text-align:left;"|
|-
|31
|Win 
|31–0
|style="text-align:left;"| Joel Casamayor
|UD 
|12
|Jan 12, 2002
|style="text-align:left;"| 
|style="text-align:left;"|
|-
|30
|Win 
|30–0
|style="text-align:left;"| Alfred Kotey
|UD 
|10 
|Sep 29, 2001
|style="text-align:left;"| 
|
|-
|29
|Win 
|29–0
|style="text-align:left;"| Orlando Soto
|KO
|1 (12), 
|Jan 27, 2001
|align=left| 
|style="text-align:left;"|
|-
|28
|Win 
|28–0
|style="text-align:left;"| Daniel Alicea
|TKO
|1 (12), 
|Dec 16, 2000
|align=left| 
|
|-
|27
|Win 
|27–0
|style="text-align:left;"| Carlos Rios
|TKO
|9 (12), 
|Sep 23, 2000
|style="text-align:left;"| 
|style="text-align:left;"|
|-
|26
|Win 
|26–0
|style="text-align:left;"| Lemuel Nelson
|TKO
|2 (12), 
|Jun 10, 2000
|align=left| 
|style="text-align:left;"|
|-
|25
|Win 
|25–0
|style="text-align:left;"| Javier Jáuregui
|KO
|1 (12), 
|Mar 18, 2000
|style="text-align:left;"| 
|style="text-align:left;"|
|-
|24
|Win 
|24–0
|style="text-align:left;"| Barry Jones
|TKO
|8 (12), 
|Jan 15, 2000
|style="text-align:left;"| 
|style="text-align:left;"|
|-
|23
|Win 
|23–0
|style="text-align:left;"| Claudio Victor Martinet
|KO
|3 (10)
|Dec 18, 1999
|style="text-align:left;"| 
|
|-
|22
|Win 
|22–0
|style="text-align:left;"| Anthony Martinez
|TKO
|2 (12), 
|Oct 26, 1999
|align=left| 
|style="text-align:left;"|
|-
|21
|Win
|21–0
|style="text-align:left;"| Anatoly Alexandrov
|KO
|1 (12), 
|Aug 7, 1999
|style="text-align:left;"| 
|style="text-align:left;"|
|-
|20
|Win 
|20–0
|style="text-align:left;"| Juan Angel Macias
|KO
|8 (12)
|Apr 2, 1999 
|align=left| 
|style="text-align:left;"|
|-
|19
|Win 
|19–0
|style="text-align:left;"| Peter Buckley
|RTD
|3 (8), 
|Dec 19, 1998
|align=left| 
|
|-
|18
|Win 
|18–0
|style="text-align:left;"| Jose Luis Montes
|TKO
|1 (12)
|Oct 16, 1998
|style="text-align:left;"| 
|style="text-align:left;"|
|-
|17
|Win 
|17–0
|style="text-align:left;"| Francisco Tomas Da Cruz
|TKO
|2 (12)
|Sep 15, 1998
|style="text-align:left;"| 
|style="text-align:left;"|
|-
|16
|Win 
|16–0
|style="text-align:left;"| Juan Gutierrez
|TKO
|1 (12)
|Aug 14, 1998
|style="text-align:left;"| 
|
|-
|15
|Win 
|15–0
|style="text-align:left;"| Rafael Oliveira
|KO
|3 (10),  
|Jun 8, 1998
|style="text-align:left;"| 
|
|-
|14
|Win 
|14–0
|style="text-align:left;"| Rildo José Oliveira
|TKO
|1 (12) 
|May 29, 1998
|style="text-align:left;"| 
|style="text-align:left;"|
|-
|13
|Win 
|13–0
|style="text-align:left;"| Gustavo Rodolfo Sayaavedra
|KO
|1 (10)
|Nov 19, 1997
|style="text-align:left;"| 
|
|-
|12
|Win 
|12–0
|style="text-align:left;"| Edwin Vazquez
|TKO
|7 (12)
|Sep 2, 1997
|style="text-align:left;"| 
|
|-
|11
|Win 
|11–0
|style="text-align:left;"| Hilario Guzman
|TKO
|8 (10),  
|Jun 27, 1997
|style="text-align:left;"| 
|
|-
|10
|Win
|10–0
|style="text-align:left;"| Johnny Montantes
|TKO
|1 (8), 
|May 10, 1997
|style="text-align:left;"| 
|
|-
|9
|Win 
|9–0
|style="text-align:left;"| Arcelio Diaz
|TKO
|1 (12)
|Apr 22, 1997
|style="text-align:left;"| 
|style="text-align:left;"|
|-
|8
|Win 
|8–0
|style="text-align:left;"| Antonio Maria Do Nascimento
|KO
|2 (6) 
|Mar 8, 1997
|style="text-align:left;"| 
|
|-
|7
|Win 
|7–0 
|style="text-align:left;"| Hamilton Cerqueira
|KO
|4 (6) 
|Feb 1, 1997
|style="text-align:left;"| 
|
|-
|6
|Win 
|6–0
|style="text-align:left;"| Gutemberg Ferreira
|KO
|2 (12) 
|Aug 16, 1996 
|style="text-align:left;"| 
|style="text-align:left;"|
|-
|5
|Win
|5–0 
|style="text-align:left;"| Ralph Riveros
|KO
|2 (6) 
|Apr 2, 1996
|style="text-align:left;"| 
|
|-
|4
|Win 
|4–0
|style="text-align:left;"| Marco De Lima
|TKO
|3 (6) 
|Nov 14, 1995
|style="text-align:left;"| 
|
|-
|3
|Win 
|3–0
|style="text-align:left;"| Manoel Oliveira da Cruz
|KO
|2 (4) 
|Sep 18, 1995
|style="text-align:left;"| 
|
|-
|2
|Win
|2–0
|style="text-align:left;"| Valdevino Monteiro
|KO
|1 (4) 
|Aug 14, 1995 
|style="text-align:left;"| 
|
|-
|1
|Win
|1–0
|style="text-align:left;"| Jose Adriano Soares
|KO
|1 (4)  
|Jul 14, 1995
|style="text-align:left;"| 
|

Exhibition

Television viewership

Brazil

See also
 List of world lightweight boxing champions

References

External links
 
 boxen-artur.de – Encyclopedia
 

1975 births
Super-featherweight boxers
Lightweight boxers
Living people
World Boxing Association champions
World Boxing Organization champions
Sportspeople from Salvador, Bahia
Pan American Games silver medalists for Brazil
Boxers at the 1995 Pan American Games
Brazilian male boxers
Pan American Games medalists in boxing
Medalists at the 1995 Pan American Games